West Qurna is one of Iraq's largest oil fields, located north of Rumaila field, west of Basra. West Qurna is believed to hold  of recoverable reserves. Until 2009, the field was closed to Western firms.

Phases

West Qurna Phase I
In November 2009, an ExxonMobil - Shell joint venture won a $50 billion contract to develop the  West Qurna Phase I. As per Iraqi Oil Ministry estimates, the project will require a $25 billion investment and another $25 billion in operating fees creating approximately 100,000 jobs in the underdeveloped southern region. ExxonMobil is set to increase the current production of  within seven years. The Iraqi government, in turn, will pay $1.90 per barrel produced by ExxonMobil-Shell alliance.

West Qurna Phase II
In December 2009, Russia's Lukoil and Norway's Statoil were awarded the rights  to develop the   West Qurna Phase II oil field. The Lukoil-Statoil alliance will receive $1.15 per barrel that they produce. In March 2012, Statoil sold its 18.75% stake in the field to Lukoil, giving the Russian firm a 75% stake, and leaving the Iraqi state oil company with 25%.

Water-injection project
A new joint multibillion-dollar water-injection project will be awarded to operator ExxonMobil. The project includes construction of a plant which will help 6 major oil-field development projects by producing  of water per day. The alliance will include Shell, Eni, Lukoil, CNPC and Petronas.

See also

al-Qurnah

References

External links
U.S. Energy Information Administration Country Analysis Brief
Exxon-led group clinches Iraq's W.Qurna contract
Exxon, Shell Win Iraq's West Qurna Contract

Oil fields of Iraq
ExxonMobil oil and gas fields
Equinor oil and gas fields
Lukoil oil and gas fields